Bacará  is a 1955 Argentine drama film directed by Kurt Land and starring Ana Mariscal and Jorge Rivier.

Cast
 Ana Mariscal as Lucía
 Jorge Rivier as Alberto Debreil
 Nathán Pinzón as Julián
 Maruja Montes as Yvonne
 Mario Lozano as Gastón
 Alberto Berco as Santiago Olivera
 Susana Campos as Marta
 Julio Bianquet as Genovés
 Jesús Pampín as Médico
 Warly Ceriani as Salías
 Leyla Dartel
 Miguel Ángel Olmos
 Miguel Ángel Valera
 A. Nenna False
 Elina Montiel as Felisa

References

External links
 

1955 films
1955 drama films
1950s Spanish-language films
Argentine black-and-white films
Films directed by Kurt Land
Argentine drama films
1950s Argentine films